Elina Risku (born 7 March 1992) is a Finnish speed skater. She competed in the women's 500 metres at the 2018 Winter Olympics.

References

External links
 

1992 births
Living people
Finnish female speed skaters
Olympic speed skaters of Finland
Speed skaters at the 2018 Winter Olympics
People from Seinäjoki
Sportspeople from South Ostrobothnia